Moon and Stone is the third album of Rana Farhan, an Iranian musician and singer of jazz and blues.  It was released in 2011.

Track listing
"Tangled" - 4:21
"One Breath" - 4:30 
"Slave to the Moment" - 5:00 		
"Blind Star" - 4:07 	
"I Stand By You" - 3:19 	
"How Sweet the Sugar" - 4:23 	
"The Moon and the Stone" - 3:57 	
"Caravan" - 5:13 	
"Iran" - 5:59	
"For Our Heart" - 4:32

References

2011 albums
Rana Farhan albums